Megachile rufescens is a species of bee in the family Megachilidae. It was described by Theodosio De Stefani Perez in 1879.

References

Rufescens
Insects described in 1879